The Society of the Friends of the Blacks (Société des amis des Noirs or Amis des noirs) was a French abolitionist society founded during the late 18th century. The society's aim was to abolish both the institution of slavery in the France's overseas colonies and French involvement in the Atlantic slave trade. The society was founded in Paris in 1788, and remained active until 1793, during the midst of the French Revolution. It was led by Jacques Pierre Brissot, who frequently received advice from British abolitionist Thomas Clarkson, who led the abolitionist movement in Great Britain. At the beginning of 1789, the Society had 141 members.

During the five-year period that it remained active, the society published abolitionist literature and frequently addressed its concerns on a substantive political level in the National Assembly. In February 1794, the National Assembly passed the Law of 4 February 1794, which effectively abolished slavery and the slave trade and gave the formerly enslaved equal rights. This decision was later reversed under Napoleon, who moved to reinstate slavery in the French colonial empire, and unsuccessfully tried to regain control of Saint-Domingue, where a slave rebellion was underway.

Several articles and monographs have explored the question of how influential the Society was in bringing about the abolition of slavery. Historians disagree about their influence, with some crediting the Amis des Noirs as instrumental in abolition, to others who say the Society was nothing more than a "société de pensée" (philosophical society).

History
The economy of France was dependent upon revenues from the colonies, which were slave societies based largely on production of sugar from cane plantations. The French economy thrived due to the lucrative triangle trade. Demand for sugar was high in Europe. Conditions on the sugar plantations on the islands of Saint-Domingue, Guadeloupe and Martinique, in the Caribbean, were so harsh that slave mortality was very high. This required steady importing of new slaves from Africa. In La Louisiane, in the southern United States, slavery was also the basis of the economy in the New Orleans and Mobile regions. Southern Louisiana had numerous sugar plantations.

Figures indicate that slave-trade activity alone during the years leading up to the French Revolution resulted in some profit percentages exceeding 100 percent. In 1784, for example, the outfitter Chaurands realized a profit of 110 percent through the use of a single ship, the Brune. In 1789, one outfitter reached 120 per cent profit on his voyages.

Jacques Pierre Brissot organized the Société des amis des Noirs in February 1788. A follower of the Philosophes, Brissot's anti-slavery efforts were also due to his exposure to humanitarian activities on both sides of the Atlantic. In the United States, where he visited Philadelphia's constitutional convention following the American Revolution, he became absorbed by [Thomas Jefferson]'s humanitarian ideals as expressed in the Declaration of Independence.  In England, Thomas Clarkson invited Brissot to attend a meeting of the Society for Effecting the Abolition of the Slave Trade. So enthused was Brissot that shortly thereafter he founded an abolitionist society in Paris. Its objectives were to suppress the slave trade and, at a later date, to attain equal rights for free persons of color. This was a class, generally in the French colonies, of persons of mixed French and African ancestry, generally born to French colonial fathers and mothers of African descent (some of whom were also of mixed-race.) The French-born or French Creoles extended them some rights, although not full equality to those of "pure" French descent.

The Amis advocated freedom in the French colonies, arguing that the ideas of the Revolution should extend to the colonies. The French concept of  did not include the liberation of slaves, because the National Assembly argued that such abolition would be detrimental to the economy. The Amis des Noirs pushed for the abolition of slavery, although Clarkson recommended they reduce their demands to abolish the Atlantic slave trade (which Great Britain and the United States did in 1808.)

Activities

Abolitionist literature
Brissot decided at the outset that he would publish written works to influence the public and politicians. and this he did in profusion. The Society published French translations of British abolitionist literature, and also works written by Brissot ("Mémoire sur les Noirs de l'Amerique septentrionale"), written in the midst of the French Revolution. It also published work by other members of the Amis des Noirs, such as Étienne Clavière ("De la France et des Etats-Unis" – co-written with Brissot) and Condorcet ("Réflexions sur l'esclavage des negres"). Members gave lectures to other societies as well, such as the Amis de l'humanité, and the Société des Amis de la Constitution.<ref>La Révolution française et l'abolition de l'esclavage (1968) '8, p. 173.</ref> It was a reflection of not only the "Philosophe upbringing" of the Society members, but also of their efforts to be active participants in the moulding of the revolutionary government.

La Société des Amis des Noirs was most active distributing its anti-slavery literature in and around Paris, due to the lack of a stable and reliable communications network, particularly as the French Revolution proceeded. The Society did make attempts to convey its message to those living outside Paris. For instance, in 1791, the society gained assistance from its Jacobin friends: "The Friends of the Blacks had several meetings with their friends in Jacobin clubs in provincial cities and sent to every city government a lengthy pamphlet exposing the injustices done to people of color."

Political activities

The political activities of the Friends of the Blacks included addresses to the National Assembly, for instance, speeches promoting the abolition of the slave trade were made in February and April 1790. Another address was delivered a few months later.La Révolution française et l'abolition de l'esclavage (1968) 7, p. 245. Four months later, a discourse was presented concerning the violence in Saint Domingue, which had broken out in a struggle for rights by free people of color and slaves.La Révolution française et l'abolition de l'esclavage (1968) 8, p. 90. In July 1791, Clavière addressed the National Assembly's commercial interests, discussing trade relations between France and its colonies.La Révolution française et l'abolition de l'esclavage (1968) 9, p. 1.

The Society also directly appealed to government individuals such as Antoine Barnave, a member of the Committee on Colonies, and Jacques Necker, France's Controller-General of Finance. Although Necker acknowledged that slavery was inhumane, he would not sanction emancipation in French colonies unless the practice of slavery and the slave trade were halted simultaneously in every country. He believed that this was needed to maintain the existing economic balance among nations. In a 1789 letter the Society urged Necker to form a committee similar to the one in England, and expressed hopes that the actions of the English parliament might have a positive effect on the Estates-General.La Révolution française et l'abolition de l'esclavage (1968) 7, p. 53. Other Society addresses denounced individuals in the colonies. One such incident occurred in 1791, when the Amis des Noirs responded to criticism written by pro-slaver Arthur Dillon, Député de la Martinique,La Révolution française et l'abolition de l'esclavage (1968) 8, p. 173. and owner of a large plantation.

In 1789, the royal government had requested petitions of grievances from all parts of the country. During the election of representatives to the Estates-General, Condorcet asked for a demand for abolition of the slave trade to be included in these cahiers de doléances. Out of the 600 cahiers assembled, fewer than 50 called for an end to the slave trade and slavery.

Society member Abbé Grégoire recommended in the fall of 1789 that two deputies to the Assembly be chosen from the population of free people of color. This was accepted by the Committee on Verification of Credentials in the National Assembly. Gregoire's was unable to present his proposal to the National Assembly because every time he rose to speak, he was shouted down by the colonists (usually planters) in the Assembly. In March 1790, Grégoire questioned the article on voting rights in the National Assembly, urging that free men of colour be given the franchise. The colonial deputies persuaded the National Assembly to close discussion of the matter. During that same month Barnave, a pro-slavery advocate, delivered his report on maintaining the slave trade. When Mirabeau, a member of the Society, advanced to the rostrum to protest, he was drowned out by cries of the opposition.

Focusing on the rights of free men of colour, Grégoire and Alexandre Pétion (another member of the Society) warned the Assembly on 15 May 1791 that if these people were not given their rights, violence would ensue in the colonies. Because of the increasing conflict in the colonies, as well as the growing influence of free men of colour with some deputies, Barnave felt that the members of the Society could not be ignored: "We can't win against the influence of the Friends of the Blacks."

On 15 May the Assembly decreed that all men of colour would be granted equal rights if they were born of free parents. Further legislation passed on 4 April 1792 (with influence from La Société des Amis des Noirs), stated that every free man of colour now enjoyed equal rights.

Opposition from pro-slavery groups

The Committee on Colonies
The Committee on Colonies was formed in March 1790 to deal with escalating problems arising from slavery unrest in the colonies. Its resolution of the problem leaned heavily in favour of the colonists, and its membership generally had little sympathy for conditions of slaves. The members of the committee included colonial landowners (who were usually slaveholders), other slave owners, lawyers and merchants, and all were advocates of French commercial interests. The final report of the Committee did not alleviate any of the problems relating to slavery. It stressed that it did not wish to interfere in the commercial interests of the colonies: "The National Assembly declares that it had not intended to innovate in any branch of commerce direct or indirect of France with its colonies..."

A group of National Assembly deputies who were either colonists or slave trade merchants lobbied the French chambers of commerce and city governments to maintain the slave trade and slavery, proclaiming that economic disaster would result from its abolition. The deputies argued their point so effectively that members of La Société des Amis des Noirs feared abolition would cause chaos. One such pro-slavery group was composed of the lobbyists for the French chambers of commerce, who designated themselves as the "Deputies Extraordinary of Manufactures and Commerce." Their main efforts focused on influencing the Committee on Agriculture and Commerce to maintain slavery and the slave trade. Since revenue from the colonies was collected mainly from the sale of slaves and crops, the committee was investigating the economic ramifications should this source of income cease to exist. Historian Quinney wrote in 1970 that Barnave's non-committal report to the National Assembly resulted from him learning that the Committee on Agriculture and Commerce "had already decided to advise the National Assembly to retain the trade and slavery."

Massiac Club
A pro-slavery organization called the Massiac Club, headquartered in Paris, was composed of colonial planters living in Paris and throughout France. The club had its main headquarters in Paris, with chapters located in the provinces. Realizing that success was related to political influence, the club proceeded to systematically contact government officials.

The Massiac members opposed any type of abolition legislation, and communicated with each colonial deputy to ensure that pro-slavery interests were maintained. Mirabeau stated that when he attempted to sway the deputies in favour of abolition, every official he spoke to had already been approached by a member of the Massiac club. The Massiac group published and distributed literature, responding in toto to practically every idea the Amis des Noirs had put forward.

In a leaflet distributed to members of the Comité de Commerce de l'Assemblée Nationale, the Massiac accused the Amis des Noirs of being involved in subversive activity. The Massiac Club published a handbill that said the abolitionists were not truly humanitarian philanthropists, but rather an organization attempting to subvert social order. They claimed the Amis des Noirs should be viewed as counter-revolutionaries, and pro-British. The pro-slavers also distributed leaflets specifically denouncing individuals: Brissot, Grégoire and Pétion. They supported the slave trade in debates held in district assemblies within Paris, and attempted to influence voting in these districts when the question of the slave trade was introduced.

Criticisms

Organisational failings
Historians have concluded that the Society was virtually impotent due to its organization, strategy, and membership criteria. In terms of organization, Quinney refers to the group's ineffective operations, stating that the government, which contained pro-slavery elements, had a nationwide propaganda network, while the Society was mainly Paris-based. Resnick concurs when he states: "Both leadership and membership at large were drawn heavily from the Paris area, with no established network of regional filiations."

In addition, they held meetings irregularly, without full membership present. Even in 1789, Thomas Clarkson commented upon the poor attendance at the meetings. The lack of organization and continuity was shown by the departure of Brissot in June 1789 for the United States to meet abolitionists, although he had organized the Society's first meeting in February 1789. He did not become active in the Society until the spring of 1790, when he again became the Society's president. The Society required presidents to serve only three months; they shared responsibility, but the short tenure hindered continuity of effort within the organization.La Révolution française et l'abolition de l'esclavage (1968) 6, pp. 27–28. The Society decided that a  "General Assembly" would be elected from within. This body would not only represent the Society and make the rules, but would also hold exclusive voting rights in the election of the officials.La Révolution française et l'abolition de l'esclavage (1968) 6, p. 26. Hence, from the organization's inception, rank and file membership were excluded from participating in the Society's operations.

Elitist membership policies
Analysis of the membership list of the Society reveals a predominance of elite individuals. Although they possessed great influence, they had most of their power in Paris. There was a lack of popular participation, which reflected the structure of government and society. The founding members of the Society included such notables as Brissot, Condorcet, Saint-Lambert, Lafayette, La Rochefoucauld, and Clavière. The Society began with a handful of abolitionists, increased to ninety-five by 1789, and would swell to a maximum of 141 associates in later years.

Of the 141 members, twenty-five percent were government employees, twenty-nine percent were nobility, and thirty-eight were professionals; the total of elitist membership made up 92% of all members. Cohen observed: "It [the Society]... concentrated on having important, well-connected members, rather than large members ... The members [were] drawn from the French social elite ..."

The Society restricted members to those who could pay dues and be recommended by four other men. There were different fee scales: two Louis per year for those who lived in Paris, and 24 livres per year for those living in the provinces.La Révolution française et l'abolition de l'esclavage (1968) 6, pp. 19–20. The membership practices of La Société des Amis des Noirs both hampered its attempt at increasing in size, and affected its ability to become a credible and effective entity.

Relationship to English abolitionists
Perroud states that Brissot's trip to London in November 1787 prompted him to form an identical chapter in France. The English society had been formed only a few months earlier, in May 1787. A group of abolitionist friends in Paris discussed how the London society encouraged others to join its cause, and noted that France and England had a commonality with respect to abolishing slavery.

The Society translated and published English anti-slavery literature. Brissot, shortly after founding the Society, wrote to Quaker James Philips, an original member of the English abolitionist society. Brissot stated his intention for the Amis des Noirs to translate and publish English anti-slavery works for distribution to the French public.

Many French citizens believed that the Society was an offshoot of the British abolitionist movement, and some suspected the British were paying them to promote their cause. This resulted in a loss of credibility in the eyes of the French public. Britain and France had historically been antagonistic towards each other for decades. Britain had defeated France in the Seven Years' War and taken over much of its territory in North America. Influences from Britain were seen as "dealing with the enemy." This view extended to encompass the activities of the Society. The perception that it was a vehicle for British infiltration into French matters overshadowed its intentions.

Outcome
The Society was rendered inactive by the outbreak of the Haitian Revolution, begun as a slave rebellion, as well as by the major crisis of the First French Republic (with the start of the French Revolutionary Wars). It remained active until 1793, publishing its calls in papers such as Patriote français, L'Analyse des papiers anglais, Le Courrier de Provence, and La chronique de Paris.

On 4 February 1794 (16 Pluviôse an II), approximately a year after the demise of the Amis des Noirs, the National Convention passed the Emancipation Declaration, abolishing slavery:'' [The National Convention declares that slavery of Negroes in all the Colonies is abolished; consequently it decrees that all men, without distinction of color, domiciled in the colonies are French citizens, and shall enjoy all the rights guaranteed by the Constitution. The public safety committee was charged with regularly reporting on measures taken to ensure implementation of this Decree].

Notable members

Joseph Bologne, Chevalier de Saint-Georges
Jacques Pierre Brissot
Jean-Louis Carra
Étienne Clavière
Étienne Charles de Loménie de Brienne
Marquis de Condorcet
Olympe de Gouges
Henri Grégoire
Samuel de Missy
Marquis de La Fayette
Honoré Gabriel Riqueti, comte de Mirabeau
Maximilien Robespierre
Dominique de La Rochefoucauld
J. Hector St. John de Crèvecœur
Léger-Félicité Sonthonax
Jérôme Pétion de Villeneuve

Notes

References

Primary sources

The following list of letters, addresses, and minutes were obtained from a collection of pamphlets entitled

Secondary sources

 (this book contains protocols of the society and can only ordered from UNESCO; content in French)

External links 
Society of the Friends of Blacks, "Address to the National Assembly in Favor of the Abolition of the Slave Trade" (5 February 1790)
Société des Amis des Noirs (France). Adresse à l'Assemblée nationale, pour l'abolition de la traite des Noirs, février 1790
Société des Amis des Noirs (France ). Adresse de la Société des Amis des Noirs, à l'Assemblée nationale, à toutes les villes, Paris, Mars 1791
Société des Amis des Noirs (France). La Société des Amis des Noirs à Arthur Dillon, député de la Martinique à l'Assemblée, mars, 1791
 
 Société des Amis des Noirs (France). Réflexions sur le Code Noir, et dénonciation d'un crime affreux commis à Saint-Domingue, Paris. Imprimerie du Patriote françois, 1790
 La Société des Amis des Noirs : quels regards sur les Africains ?, Manioc video, 2013

Groups of the French Revolution
1788 in France
1789 events of the French Revolution
1790 events of the French Revolution
1791 events of the French Revolution
1792 events of the French Revolution
1793 events of the French Revolution
Abolitionist organizations
Political organizations based in France
Organizations established in 1788
1793 disestablishments
Abolitionism in France
1788 establishments in France
Causes of the French Revolution